Rimvydas is a Lithuanian masculine given name. People bearing the name Rimvydas include:
Rimvydas Šalčius (born 1985), Lithuanian former swimmer
Rimvydas Raimondas Survila (born 1939), Lithuanian politician
Rimvydas Turčinskas (born 1956), Lithuanian politician and physician 
Rimvydas Valatka (born 1956), Lithuanian journalist and signatory of the Act of the Re-Establishment of the State of Lithuania

References

Lithuanian masculine given names